Bikulka is a rural locality (a village) in Chernushinsky District, Perm Krai, Russia. The population was 34 as of 2010. There is 1 street.

Geography 
Bikulka is located 14 km northeast of Chernushka (the district's administrative centre) by road. Ryabki is the nearest rural locality.

References 

Rural localities in Chernushinsky District